The Grumman XTSF was a proposed twin-engine torpedo scout aircraft, designed by Grumman for the United States Navy towards the end of World War II. Based on the design of the Grumman F7F Tigercat fighter, but enlarged and with the addition of a bomb bay, the XTSF was deemed too large for carrier operations, and the project was cancelled before any aircraft were built. Instead, the Navy chose to order the single-engine XTB3F, which became the successful AF Guardian.

Design and development
In 1944, it was determined that the Grumman XTB2F, then under development for the Navy, would be too large to practically and safely operate from aircraft carriers. Even the new s, known as "battle carriers" (CVB) and the largest aircraft carriers built by any nation to that point, would have difficulty operating the massive aircraft, which was the size of a U.S. Army Air Force medium bomber. As a result, in late June 1944, Grumman submitted its G-66 design to the Bureau of Aeronautics (BuAer). After a review of the design by BuAer during the following month, a revised design was submitted, and on August 17 the existing contract for the XTB2F was modified to instead order two XTSF-1 aircraft, to be based on Grumman's F7F-2 Tigercat two-seat, twin-engined fighter-bomber, the first prototype intended to be a conversion of a F7F airframe.

A mid-wing, all-metal, cantilever monoplane with two Pratt & Whitney Double Wasp radial engines mounted in streamlined nacelles under the wing, the XTSF-1 was intended to carry two crew members in tandem seats, and featured an internal bomb bay and an SCR-720 radar set, the radar later being replaced in the design by an AN/APS-3 or AN/APS-4 set. A second seat was added for the radar operator.

The outer wing of the XTSF was lengthened by  compared to that of the F7F-2, while the size of the horizontal stabilizer was increased by ). The vertical stabilizer was also enlarged, while the aircraft's weight increased by almost  over that of the Tigercat.

The wings folded upwards for stowage aboard aircraft carriers, while the undercarriage and arrestor hook were hydraulically operated.

Cancellation
A mockup of the cockpit, center fuselage, and wing center section was built and was inspected by the BuAer in the fall 1944. However, the contract for the prototype XTSF-1s was terminated in January 1945. This was due to a variety of factors, including the Navy's belief that the Grumman engineers and factory were already at capacity producing the F6F Hellcat, the F7F, and the F8F Bearcat, that the XTSF-1 would be too large for practical operations from escort carriers, and because it was believed the Grumman G-70, to be built as the XTB3F, was a better prospect. In addition, the F7F was proving difficult to certify for operations from aircraft carriers, further prejudicing the Navy against the design.

Some sources erroneously state that the XTSF-1 became the XTB2F, however this is not the case. The XTSF-1 was the only aircraft ever designated by the U.S. Navy in the 'TS for Torpedo Scout' category, the designation being superseded and incorporated, along with 'BT for Bomber-Torpedo', 'SB for Scout-Bomber', and 'TB for Torpedo-Bomber', into the new 'A for Attack' series.

Specifications (XTSF-1)

See also

References

Citations

Bibliography

External links

 
 "Grumman Designs and Proposals", The Grumman Pages.
 TS - Torpedo Scout Aircraft, U.S. Military Aircraft and Weapon Designations

TS01F
Cancelled military aircraft projects of the United States
High-wing aircraft
Carrier-based aircraft
Twin piston-engined tractor aircraft